Buster & Chauncey's Silent Night is a 1998 American direct-to-video animated feature film, inspired by the tale of the creation of the Christmas carol "Silent Night". It was directed by Buzz Potamkin and stars the voices of Phil Hartman (in his final film role), Jim Cummings, Marie Osmond, Tom Arnold and (a then-unknown) Lea Michele, and the songs were written by Lynn Ahrens and Stephen Flaherty. The film was Hartman‘s last film prior to his death.

Synopsis
In 1818, two mouse musicians named Buster and Chauncey visit the Alpine town of Oberndorf, Austria, where they plan to perform for the country's Queen during its annual Christmas pageant, which is organized by Oberndorf's Mayor Huffenmeier. At Oberndorf, an orphan girl named Christina is given asylum on the local church as she intends to go to Vienna where her aunt and uncle live, but a pair of thieves, who claim to be the Duke of Raoche and his niece Lady Gretchen, watching over the preparations for the pageant, have their sights set on seizing the riches stored inside the church. Buster and Chauncey also get settled in the church for the preparations, but a cat chases them causing a mess inside the church that Mayor Huffenmeier blames Christina for, but the church priest, Father Joseph, doesn't think Christina caused the mess. However, the Duke and Lady Gretchen manage to steal the riches and also kidnap Christina, leaving her necklace on the place where the riches were so Father Joseph and Mayor Huffenmeier believe she stole them. Buster and Chauncey later help Christina escape and the Duke and Lady Gretchen are caught, with the riches being recovered, proving that Christina is innocent all along, but the previous chase caused damage to the church's organ. Later on, the melody Chauncey has been playing repeatedly on his violin inspires the organist. Father Joseph, who has written a poem, uses the melody to compose "Silent Night" and perform it for the first time. The Queen then offers to take Christina to Vienna and Christina says goodbye to her new friends, Buster and Chauncey.

Cast

Beth Anderson (singer)/Joan Beal/Amick Byram/Randy Crenshaw/Kevin Dorsey/Jonathan Dokuchitz/Tim Davis/Jon Robert Hall/Linda Harmon/Luana Jackman/Nick Jameson/Bob Joyce/Jon Joyce/Norman Large/Edie Lehmann/Rick Logan/Arnold McCuller/Bobbi Page/Sally Stevens/Susie Stevens Logan/Gary Stockdale/Carmen Twillie (actress)/Lauren Wood as Chorus

Production

Silent Night was the first in-house animated production for Columbia TriStar Home Video, and was produced by Buzz Potamkin through his own company, Project X Productions. It was Phil Hartman’s last film; the film was released months after his murder. Marie Osmond, one of its stars, sang the title tune. The film features future Glee actress Lea Michele in one of her first film roles.

Songs

Release

On October 13, 1998, Columbia TriStar released Buster & Chauncey's Silent Night on videocassette. The film aired on the primetime lineup of cable's Disney Channel two months later. Overseas, it was also shown in Canada (on national network CTV and cable station Teletoon). On Latin America, the film airs occasionally on Cartoon Network since 2001, and most recently on Disney Channel since 2012; on Great Britain's Five; and on the Movie Channel in Israel. The film was reissued on DVD on September 19, 2000; by late 2002, the film had sold over 800,000 copies in the U.S. Plans for a sequel were discussed shortly after the original release, but never materialized.

Reception

Reviews were generally negative. At the DVD Verdict review site, "Judge" Gary Militzer gave it an overall score of 43. While criticizing the animation and storyline—along with puns relating to the word "mouse"—he added, "Think of all the great memories we have watching those enduring Christmas specials like Rudolph the Red-Nosed Reindeer, Frosty the Snowman, 'Twas the Night Before Christmas, or my personal favorite, A Christmas Story. Unfortunately [this film] certainly cannot stand alongside those timeless, beloved holiday classics." Similarly, Brian Webster of the Apollo Movie Guide gave it a 42. "[This] is an example of a less ambitious animated film," he said, "[which] has more in common with Saturday morning cartoons than it does with recent animated successes." Both he and Militzer not only observed the accents of the characters—the main characters speak like Americans, while the thieves and some townspeople have peculiar German tones—but also "out of sync" animation. Lois Alter Mark of Entertainment Weekly commented, "Probably not [a good choice for youngsters]. The scattershot story and uninspired animation won't hold most kids' attention." Writing in the Los Angeles Times, Lynne Heffley said, "The animation is standard, but the message about the meaning of the season, based on the writing of the soulful Christmas carol, comes through."

See also
 List of American films of 1998
 List of animated feature films
 List of Christmas films

References

External links

 
 

1998 direct-to-video films
1998 animated films
1998 films
1990s American animated films
1990s Christmas films
1990s musical films
American Christmas films
American children's animated musical films
Animated Christmas films
Films set in Austria
Films set in the 1810s
Direct-to-video animated films
Sony Pictures direct-to-video films
American animated featurettes
1990s children's animated films
1990s English-language films